Events from the year 1987 in France.

Incumbents
 President: François Mitterrand 
 Prime Minister: Jacques Chirac

Events
24 March – The Euro Disneyland Project agreement is signed by The Walt Disney Company and the French government, enabling a theme park to be built to the east of Paris. The theme park, today known as Disneyland Paris, eventually opened in April 1992.
11 May – Klaus Barbie goes on trial in Lyon for war crimes committed during World War II.
May – Peugeot launches the 405 range of four-door saloons; a five-door estate is to follow in 1988. It will be built in France and also at the old Rootes/Chrysler Europe factory in Britain.
4 July – A court in Lyon sentences former Gestapo boss Klaus Barbie to life imprisonment for crimes against humanity.
1 December – Construction of the Channel Tunnel is initiated.
17 December – Peugeot 405 is elected European Car of the Year. Another French car, the Citroen AX, comes second in the contest.

Births

January to March
2 January – Loïc Rémy, soccer player.
6 January – Magalie Vaé, singer
23 January
The Avener, deep house producer
Cyril Cinélu, singer.
Louisa Nécib, soccer player.
9 February – Jérémy Acedo, soccer player.
15 February – Romain Gasmi, soccer player.
16 February – Willy Aubameyang, soccer player.
17 February – Thomas Ayasse, soccer player.
26 February – Jean-Philippe Sabo, soccer player.
28 February – Édouard Collin, actor.
4 March – Jean-Philippe Mendy, soccer player.
7 March – Hatem Ben Arfa, soccer player.
13 March – Pierre Jamin, soccer player.
14 March – Aravane Rezaï, tennis player.
16 March – Fabien Lemoine, soccer player.
21 March – Maxime Josse, soccer player.
23 March – Nathalie Fauquette, rhythmic gymnast.
24 March – Pierre-Loup Bouquet, ice dancer.
31 March – Amaury Bischoff, soccer player.

April to June
4 April – Jérémy Taravel, soccer player.
16 April – Loris Arnaud, soccer player.
16 April – Lhadji Badiane, soccer player.
18 April – Anthony Roux, cyclist.
18 April – Kévin Sireau, cyclist.
29 April – Basile Camerling, soccer player.
6 May – Romain Beynié, soccer player.
7 May – Pierre Ducasse, soccer player.
7 May – Serge Gakpé, soccer player.
7 May – Jérémy Menez, soccer player.
12 May – Loïc Lumbilla Kandja, soccer player.
15 May – Kévin Constant, soccer player.
26 May – Quentin Garcia, professional ice hockey player.
7 June – Jean Philippe Baile, rugby league player.
9 June – Toumani Diagouraga, soccer player.
9 June – Valentin Roberge, soccer player.
26 June – Samir Nasri, international soccer player.
27 June – Jean-François Christophe, soccer player.

July to September
21 July – Bilel Mohsni, footballer.
23 July – Élodie Brouiller, ice dancer.
24 July – Nordine Assami, soccer player.
24 July – Cyriaque Louvion, soccer player.
30 July – Benoît Costil, soccer player.
6 August – Rémy Riou, soccer player.
8 August – Pierre Boulanger, actor.
19 August – Anaïs Lameche, singer.
11 September – Clément Chantôme, soccer player.
18 September – Ludovic Genest, soccer player.

October to December
15 October – Serge Akakpo, soccer player.
1 December – Rémi Sergio, soccer player.
19 December – Cédric Baseya, soccer player.
22 December – Garfield Darien, hurdler
31 December – Émilie Le Pennec, gymnast, Olympic gold medallist.

Deaths

January to June
2 January – Jean de Gribaldy, cyclist and directeur sportif (born 1922).
31 January – Yves Allégret, film director (born 1907).
18 February – Edmond Pagès, cyclist (born 1911).
24 February – Henri Pinault, Roman Catholic Bishop of Chengdu (born 1904).
15 March – Léon Fleuriot, linguist and historian (born 1923).
19 March – Louis de Broglie, physicist and a Nobel laureate (born 1892).
1 April – Henri Cochet, tennis player (born 1901).
3 May – Dalida, singer (born 1933).
23 June – Sauveur Ducazeaux, cyclist (born 1911).

July to December
6 July – Pierre Marcilhacy, politician (born 1910).
23 August – Didier Pironi, motor racing driver (born 1952).
3 October – Jean Anouilh, dramatist (born 1910).
27 October – Jean Hélion, painter and author (born 1904).
28 October – André Masson, artist (born 1896).
1 November – Pierre Matignon, cyclist (born 1943).
3 November – André Roussin, playwright (born 1911).
4 November – Pierre Seghers, poet and editor (born 1906).
5 November – Georges Franju, filmmaker (born 1912).
6 November – Jean Rivier, composer (born 1896).
18 November – Jacques Anquetil, cyclist, five times Tour de France winner (born 1934).
2 December – Luis Federico Leloir, doctor and biochemist who received the 1970 Nobel Prize in Chemistry (born 1906).
3 December – Pierre Mollaret, neurologist (born 1898).
13 December – Julien Darui, international soccer player (born 1916).
15 December – François Borde, rugby union player (born 1899).

Full date unknown
Roland Ansieau, graphic artist (born 1901).
Norbert Casteret, caver and adventurer (born 1897).
Henri Decaë, cinematographer (born 1915).
Robert Filliou, artist (born 1926).
René Hardy, French Resistance member (born 1911).
Raymond Ruyer, philosopher (born 1902).
Michel Tapié, artist, critic, curator and art collector (born 1909).

References

Links

1980s in France